State Route 700 (SR 700) is a  long north–south state highway in the northeastern portion of the U.S. state of Ohio. Its northern terminus is at a traffic circle where it meets SR 87 in Burton, a point that doubles as the northern terminus of SR 168.

Route description

Along its path, SR 700 passes through northern Portage County and southern Geauga County.  No portion of this highway is included within the National Highway System (NHS).  The NHS is a network of routes deemed to be most important for the economy, mobility and defense of the nation.

History
The route was originally part of the larger State Route 80, established in 1923. The original northern terminus for SR 80 was at US 422 in Welshfield before being extended north in 1939 to the current northern terminus of SR 700 at State Route 87 in Burton. The SR 700 designation was applied to the current route in 1942 after the section of SR 80 between State Route 88 in Freedom and State Route 14 in Edinburg was decommissioned in 1941 as part of the creation of the Ravenna Army Ammunition Plant. The portion from Edinburg south retained the SR 80 designation until 1962, when it was renumbered as State Route 183. As of 2020, SR 700 follows its original routing through Portage and Geauga Counties and has been paved for its entire lifespan.

Major intersections

References

700
Transportation in Portage County, Ohio
Transportation in Geauga County, Ohio